London City Airport  is a regional airport in London, England. These are the twin centres of London's financial industry, which is a major user of the airport. The airport was developed by the engineering company Mowlem in 1986–87. In 2016 it was bought by a Canadian-led consortium of Alberta Investment Management Corporation (AIMCo), OMERS, the Ontario Teachers' Pension Plan and Wren House Infrastructure Management of the Kuwait Investment Authority.

London City had over 4.5 million passenger movements in 2017. It is the fifth-busiest airport by passengers and aircraft movements serving the London area — after Heathrow, Gatwick, Stansted and Luton — and was the 14th-busiest in the UK in 2017. In 2019, the airport handled over 5 million passengers.

History

Proposal and construction
The airport was first proposed in 1981 by Reg Ward, who was Chief Executive of the newly formed London Docklands Development Corporation (LDDC) that was responsible for the regeneration of the area. He in turn discussed the proposal with chairman of John Mowlem & Co Sir Philip Beck and the idea of an airport for Docklands was born. By November of that year Mowlem and Bill Bryce of Brymon Airways had submitted an outline proposal to the LDDC for a Docklands STOLport city centre gateway.

On 27 June 1982 Brymon's Captain Harry Gee landed a de Havilland Canada Dash 7 turboprop aircraft on Heron Quays, in the nearby West India Docks, in order to demonstrate the feasibility of the STOLport project. Later that year the LDDC published a feasibility study, an opinion poll amongst local residents showed a majority in favour of the development of the airport, and Mowlem submitted an application for planning permission.

A 63-day planning inquiry started on 6 June 1983. By the middle of the following year, Nicholas Ridley the Secretary of State for Transport had indicated that he was "disposed to agree the application", but asked for further details. The Greater London Council brought an action in the High Court of Justice to reopen the inquiry. After the High Court dismissed the action in March 1985, outline planning permission was granted in May of that year, followed by the grant of detailed planning permission in early 1986.

Construction began on the site shortly after permission was granted, with Charles, Prince of Wales laying the foundation stone of the terminal building, designed by R Seifert and Partners, on 2 May 1986. The first aircraft landed on 31 May 1987, with the first commercial services operating from 26 October 1987. Queen Elizabeth II officially opened London City Airport in November of the same year.

Opening and runway extension
In 1988, the first full year of operation, the airport handled 133,000 passengers. The earliest scheduled flights were operated to and from Plymouth, Paris, Amsterdam and Rotterdam. With a runway of only  in length, and a slope of the glidepath of 7.5° (for noise abatement reasons), the airport could only be used by a very limited number of aircraft types, principally the Dash 7 and the smaller Dornier 228. In 1989, the airport submitted a planning application to extend the runway, allowing the use of a larger number of aircraft types.

In 1990, the airport handled 230,000 passengers, but the figures fell drastically after the Gulf War and did not recover until 1993, when 245,000 passengers were carried. By this time the extended runway had been approved and opened (on 5 March 1992). At the same time the glide path was reduced to 5.5°, still steep for a European airport (the slope of an airport glide path is normally 3.0°), but sufficient to allow a larger range of aircraft, including the BAe 146 regional jet liner and Airbus A318, to serve the airport.

By 1995, passenger numbers reached half a million, and Mowlem sold the airport to Irish businessman Dermot Desmond. Five years later passenger numbers had climbed to 1,580,000, and over 30,000 flights were operated. In 2002, a jet centre catering to corporate aviation was opened, as well as additional aircraft stands at the western end of the apron. In 2003, a new ground holding point was established at the eastern end of the runway, enabling aircraft awaiting takeoff to hold there whilst other aircraft landed.

Further expansion

On 2 December 2005, London City Airport DLR station opened on a branch of the Docklands Light Railway, providing rail access to the airport for the first time, and providing fast rail links to Canary Wharf and the City of London. By 2006, more than 2.3 million passengers used London City Airport.

In October 2006, the airport was purchased from Dermot Desmond by a consortium comprising insurer AIG Financial Products and Global Infrastructure Partners (GIP). In the final quarter of 2008 GIP increased its stake in the airport to 75%, the remaining 25% belonging to Highstar Capital.

London City Airport was granted planning permission to construct an extended apron with four additional aircraft parking stands and four new gates to the east of the terminal in 2001; they became operational on 30 May 2008. They are carried on piles above the water of the King George V Dock.

British Airways commenced the first scheduled transatlantic flights from the airport in September 2009, with a twice a day service to New York City's John F. Kennedy International Airport using a specially configured Airbus A318 aircraft. The A318 is the smallest airliner to operate transatlantic since BA's corporate predecessor, BOAC, began transatlantic jet flights on 4 October 1958, with the De Havilland Comet 4.

The first day of the service, one week after Willie Walsh of British Airways pledged to the United Nations that aviation would deliver deep cuts in carbon emissions, was disrupted by activists from Plane Stupid and Fight the Flights dressed up in business suits.

London Olympics 2012 

Before the 2012 Summer Olympics in London, it was reported that over £7 million (in 2011) was invested in the terminal to extend the Central Search area and adding other improvements. During the Games, however, the airport was only open for a few hours and there were street restrictions (for security), and the low capacity ramp and short runway excluded most long-range arrivals. However, it was the closest airport to Olympic Park, with normal scheduled travel by road of 15 minutes.

Current expansion 
In early 2013, work was expected to start on a £15m investment programme to refurbish the western pier with new departure gates and improved lounges and to redevelop the international arrivals hall and baggage handling areas. In response to the UK government white paper The Future of Air Transport, the airport operators have produced a master plan outlining their vision for growth up to 2030. The plan was subject to public consultation during spring 2006, and has been republished incorporating comments from this consultation. The master plan shows a phased expansion of the airport, giving the capability of handling 8 million passengers per annum by 2030. It does not propose the addition of a second runway, or significant expansion of the airport boundaries. Phase 1 of this development would be undertaken by 2015. It would include the in-progress construction of the eastern apron extension and provision of a finger pier to the south of this apron to provide passenger access to aircraft using the new parking stands. The terminal building would also be extended to use the triangle of land between it and the railway station. The existing jet centre serving corporate aviation would be extended, a new hangar built to allow aircraft maintenance, and a replacement fire station provided.

Phases 2 and 3 would be undertaken between 2015 and 2030. Further aircraft parking stands would be built to the east of the terminal, and a taxiway would be constructed alongside and to the south of the runway, to avoid the need for aircraft to back-track on the runway. Both these developments would involve further reduction in the water area of the King George V Dock. The existing fuel farm would be relocated to a site at the east of the airport, where it could be supplied by barge, and linked to a hydrant based supply system, thus eliminating both road tanker deliveries and on-airport fuel bowser movements. The existing surface car park would be replaced by a multi-storey car park, allowing extension of the vehicle drop-off and pick up area. The jet centre and hangar facilities would be further extended. Finally the existing terminal building would be replaced.

In line with phase 1 of the master plan, London City Airport made a planning application to the London Borough of Newham in August 2007. This would allow it to increase the number of flights per year from 80,000 to 120,000 by 2010. In July 2008, the Planning Officer for Newham Council produced a report on the Planning Application, recommending that planning permission be granted. The decision was deferred by the council's Development Control Committee at their meeting on 30 July 2008, following a request from Boris Johnson, the Mayor of London, that the decision be delayed until after a study by the National Air Traffic Services (NATS) has been published.

Over 10,000 local residents were consulted by Newham Council over the plan of which 1,109 replied, 801 with objections and 308 in support. The 801 objections mainly concerned increase in noise, increase in air pollution, surface transport, socio-economics and regeneration. The 308 supporters mainly concerned the reduction of air pollution, an alternative London and 2012 Olympic gateway, additional jobs, and benefiting to the local economy. The residents campaign group HACAN East (formerly Fight the Flights) is opposed to expansion due to noise and pollution issues.

On 29 September 2009, Fight the Flights took Newham Council to court in order to challenge their decision to allow a 50% increase from 76,000 to 120,000 flights. On 20 January 2010, the challenge was dismissed, and a deadline of 14 days to appeal was set. The plan was given the go-ahead in February 2015. However this was overturned by Boris Johnson in March 2015. On 27 July 2016 London City Airport was given approval by authorities for their £344m expansion plan.

Recent developments 
In October 2015, Global Infrastructure Partners which owned 75% of the facility, put it up for sale, with the agreement of Oaktree Capital Management which holds the remaining 25%. A sale to a Canadian-led consortium of Alberta Investment Management Corporation (AIMCo), OMERS, the Ontario Teachers' Pension Plan and Wren House Infrastructure Management of the Kuwait Investment Authority for £2 billion was confirmed in February 2016. The sale was completed on 10 March 2016.

In September 2016, British Airways announced the termination of one of its two daily long-haul all-business class services from the airport to New York City, citing economic reasons.

Green Party candidate for the 2016 London mayoral election and member of the London Assembly Siân Berry has been vocal in calling for the closure of London City Airport and subsequent redevelopment of the area it occupies. Caroline Russell, the leader of the Green Party on the London Assembly and Scott Ainslie, former Green MEP for London and councillor on Lambeth Council have both called for its closure.

In March 2020, British Airways suspended its daily service to New York due to the COVID-19 pandemic. In September 2020, the airline confirmed the service would not return.

In January 2021, after a delay due to the COVID-19 pandemic, London City became the first major airport controlled by a remote Air traffic control tower.

Operations

Served destinations
Owing to London City Airport's proximity to London's Docklands and financial district, the airport's primary users are business travellers with destinations such as Luxembourg and Frankfurt, although the number of leisure destinations served like Palma de Mallorca, Málaga or Chambéry has increased in recent years. London City is at its busiest during the winter months, when a number of airlines, most notably British Airways and Swiss International Air Lines, fly to ski resort gateway destinations. Zürich, Geneva, and Milan are among the destinations popular among winter sports enthusiasts.

In July 2020, British Airways announced the termination of its all-business-class flights between City and New York-JFK, which had been operated since 2009.

Facilities and utilized aircraft
Due to the airport's proximity to Central London, it has stringent rules imposed to limit the noise impact from aircraft operations. The size and layout of the airport and overall complexity caused by the lack of taxiways mean that the airport gets very busy during peak hours. The air traffic controllers have to deal with over 38 flights per hour on a runway which, prior to the opening of the full length taxiway at the end of 2020, required a lengthy backtrack for each aircraft needing to depart from runway 27 or land on runway 09. Operations are restricted to 06:30 to 22:30 Monday to Friday, 06:30 to 13:00 on Saturdays and 12:30 to 22:30 on Sundays. These restrictions are related to noise. On 19 December 2022, the airport applied for the restriction on Saturday afternoon to be removed.

Mid-range airliners seen at London City include the ATR 42 (both −300 and −500 variants), ATR 72, Airbus A318, Bombardier Q400, BAe 146/Avro RJ, Dornier 328, Embraer ERJ 135, Embraer 170, Embraer 190 and Fokker 50. On 30 January 2009, trials were completed successfully with the ATR 72–500, leading to its approval for use at the airport. The Embraer 190SR underwent trials from 28 March 2009, and thereafter gained approval. The Fokker 70, BAe Jetstream 41, Saab 340 and Saab 2000 also have approval for scheduled operations at the airport. A number of airlines including Swiss and Odyssey have ordered the Airbus A220 with the intention of operating it from London City once delivered and approved. A220-100 operations for Swiss from City commenced in late 2017.

On 22–23 March 2017, the A220-100 completed tests for the 5.5-degree approach in Wichita and Salina, Kansas. The A220-100 was certified for the steep approach landing for London City in April 2017. Corporate aircraft such as the Beechcraft Super King Air, Cessna CitationJet series, Hawker 400, Hawker 800, Piaggio Avanti and variants of the Dassault Falcon business jets are increasingly common. The airport is not available for use by single-engine aircraft or helicopters; recreational flights and single-pilot operations are also not permitted.

The size of the airport, constrained by the water-filled Royal Albert and King George V docks to the north and south respectively, also means that there are no covered maintenance facilities for aircraft. In the late 2000s, the airport was envisaged for use as a seaplane base by AirSea Lines.

Terminal
With space limited in the London Docklands area, and comparatively low passenger volumes, London City Airport is small compared with several other airports serving London, such as Heathrow, Gatwick, Stansted, Southend and Luton. The airport has a single, two-storey passenger terminal building with 18 gates, all hardstands. The ground floor contains the check-in desks and some service facilities as well as a staircase leading to the security control on the upper level, after which the airside waiting area and several more shops can be found. The waiting area is connected to piers on both sides where corridors on the upper floor lead to the departure gates on the ground level. As the airport has no jet bridges, walk-boarding is used on all stands.

Airlines and destinations
The following airlines operate regular services to and from London City Airport:

Statistics

Passengers
Passenger numbers at London City Airport saw rapid growth between 2003 and 2008, doubling from around 1.5 million per year to over 3 million. Totals declined in 2009 and 2010, but have since recovered and in 2019 over 5.1 million passengers passed through London City. In 2020, passenger numbers sharply dropped to below 1 million annually during the COVID-19 pandemic.

Routes

Ground transport

Docklands Light Railway

London City Airport is served by London City Airport DLR station, which is an elevated station adjoining the terminal building.

Elizabeth line

Until 2006, Silvertown railway station on the North London line served the airport, but it was closed during the construction of Crossrail. The Elizabeth line, which opened in May 2022, passes around 300 m to the south of the airport, but does not stop there. Proposals were put forward that a new station should be opened on the Elizabeth line to serve the airport, but a London City Airport station was not included in TfL's Crossrail plans.

Road access
The airport is served by the A1020 road and the A112 road. These give fast links to Canning Town, the City of London and Stratford, as well as connecting to the A13 and the North Circular Road, London (A406). Also the A13 provides easy access to the M25 motorway, as with the A406 connecting to the M11 motorway.
The airport has both a short-term and a long-term car park, both within walking distance of the terminal and a taxi rank outside the terminal door.

Local buses
The airport is served by London Buses services:
473 to Stratford via Plaistow and North Woolwich
474 to Canning Town and Manor Park via Beckton and East Ham

The express shuttle buses, which formerly ran to various destinations, were withdrawn after the DLR line was built.

Riverboat
Thames Clippers services call at a new pier at the nearby residential development Royal Wharf, allowing travel into Central London using an Oyster card or contactless smart card.

Accidents and incidents
 On 13 February 2009, BA CityFlyer Flight 8456 (an Avro RJ100, registered G-BXAR, flying from Amsterdam) suffered a nose-gear collapse while landing at London City. None of the 67 passengers or five crew members were seriously injured in the incident, but three passengers suffered minor injuries; two of them were kept in hospital overnight. The aircraft was damaged beyond economic repair, and was written off by insurers in May 2009.
On 21 October 2016, 27 people were injured, two of them seriously, when a tear gas substance was released in London City Airport. Hundreds of other passengers reported experiencing temporary blindness and itching. Many flights were cancelled, leaving thousands stranded and causing major disruption around Europe. A few days later, police arrested a suspect under 'terror offences' and the media referred to the incident as a terror attack. Police later confirmed that tear gas bottles had deliberately been placed to 'cause harm or disruption'. Security was increased at the airport in the days following the attack.
In 2019, Extinction Rebellion protesters disrupted some approaches to the airport; one person climbed onto the terminal building and a Paralympian climbed on top of an aircraft. The railway station at the airport was occupied for some hours.

See also
 List of airports in the United Kingdom and the British Crown Dependencies
 Airports of London

References

External links 

 
 London City Airport Consultative Committee

City Airport
Airports in England
Transport in the London Borough of Newham
Companies based in the London Borough of Newham
1987 establishments in England